Miss World Malaysia 2018, the 51st edition of the Miss World Malaysia and the first edition under a new management was held at the Borneo Convention Centre Kuching in Sarawak on 8 September 2018. 

Present were Sarawak Chief Minister, Datuk Patinggi Abang Johari Tun Openg and his wife Datin Patinggi Juma'ani Tuanku Bujang as well as Toh Puan Raghad Kurdi Taib, the wife of the Yang di-Pertua Negeri of Sarawak and Datuk Haji Abdul Karim Rahman Hamzah, Minister of Tourism, Arts, Culture, Youth and Sports. The winner received a crown worth RM4 million, RM30,000 cash and RM30,000 worth of prizes. The event itself was supported by the Ministry of Tourism Sarawak.

12 contestants competed in the grand finale. Sarawakian lass Larissa Ping was crowned Miss World Malaysia 2018. She was crowned by Malaysian actresses, Nabila Huda and Carmen Soo. She then represented Malaysia at Miss World 2018 in Sanya, China where she placed in the Top 30.

Results

Special awards

Contestants 
12 contestants competed for the crown and title.

Judges 
The following served as judges on the coronation night of Miss World Malaysia 2018:
 Amber Chia – Actress, Model, TV Host
 Carmen Soo – Actress, Model
 Dewi Liana Seriestha – Miss World Malaysia 2014
 Nabila Huda – Actress, TV Host, Emcee
 Sapphire Wong – Miss Cheongsam Sarawak 2016
 Tong Bing Yu – Artist

Crossovers & Returnees 

International Pageants

World Miss University
 2017: Loh Shi Min
 2014: Naomi Sim En Yi

 National Pageants

Miss Universe Malaysia
 2018: Shannen Jade Totten (Top 10)

Miss World Malaysia
 2016: Francisca James (4th Runner-up)
 2014: Esther Chew En Qi

Miss Global International Malaysia
 2017: Loh Shi Min
 2014: Naomi Sim En Yi (4th Runner-up)

Miss Malaysia Tourism
 2016: Esther Chew En Qi

World Miss University Malaysia
 2017: Loh Shi Min (Winner)
 2014: Naomi Sim En Yi (Winner)

Supermodel International Malaysia
 2017: Naomi Sim En Yi (1st Runner-up)

Miss India Worldwide
 2018: Dhurghesswary Uthawaraj (Top 12)

References

External links
 

Events in Sarawak
2018
September 2018 events in Malaysia